Mangifera gracilipes is a species of plant in the family Anacardiaceae. It is found in Indonesia and Malaysia.

References

gracilipes
Trees of Malesia
Least concern plants
Taxonomy articles created by Polbot